Ally McBeal is a comedy-drama television series created by David E. Kelley, premiered on September 8, 1997 on Fox network in the United States and ended on May 20, 2002. The show spans five seasons, consisting, in total, of 112 episodes. The episodes were approximately 45 minutes long, excluding commercials.

All seasons of Ally McBeal were released on DVD in the region 2 in 2002 and 2003, respectively. Until fall 2009, only several episodes of the first season of Ally McBeal were available in the United States, due to music rights issues. On October 6, 2009, Fox released a 6-disc set of all 23 season-one episodes, with their original music.

Ally McBeal follows an eccentric lawyer, Allison Marie "Ally" McBeal, and her group of friends from work, focusing on their personal and romantic lives, as well as their business cases which would often contrast or reinforce a character's drama. The series starred Calista Flockhart as Ally, Greg Germann as Richard Fish, Jane Krakowski as Elaine Vassal, Peter MacNicol as John Cage, Lisa Nicole Carson as Renée Raddick, Portia de Rossi as Nelle Porter, Lucy Liu as Ling Woo, Gil Bellows as Billy Thomas, Courtney Thorne-Smith as Georgia Thomas, Vonda Shepard as herself, Robert Downey Jr. as Larry Paul, and many others.

Series overview

Episodes

Season 1 (1997–98)

Season 2 (1998–99)

Season 3 (1999–2000)

Season 4 (2000–01)

Season 5 (2001–02)

References

See also
 List of The Practice episodes - includes the 1998 crossover episode "Axe Murderer"

External links

Ally McBeal on Paramount Comedy

Episodes
Lists of American comedy-drama television series episodes
Lists of American romance television series episodes

it:Ally McBeal#Episodi